The Selun is one of the peaks of the Churfirsten range, located in the Appenzell Alps. It lies between the valley of Toggenburg and Lake Walenstadt in the canton of St. Gallen. The summit is easily accessible by a trail on the northern side.

The peak is named for the extended alpine pasture Selunalp to the peak's north-west, situated above c. 1700 m. The name's etymology is uncertain, possibly from a *sellonem (Latin sella) "saddle".
Named for   Selunalp is Johannes Seluner (c. 1828–1898) who was found in 1844 as a  feral child living in Wildenmannlisloch cave.

References

External links

Selun on Hikr

Mountains of the Alps
Mountains of the canton of St. Gallen
Appenzell Alps
Mountains of Switzerland